Diane Dolores Modahl  (née Edwards, born 17 June 1966) is an English former middle distance runner who specialised in the 800 metres. She won Gold in the 800 m title at the 1990 Commonwealth Games, Silver at the 1986 Commonwealth Games, and Bronze at the 1998 Commonwealth Games.

Her other notable results include finishing third at the 1989 IAAF Grand Prix Final, fourth at the 1993 World Championships, and winning the European Cup in 1994. She also won six AAAs National 800 m titles.

She represented Great Britain at four Olympic Games (1988–2000), reaching the 800 m final in 1988.

Her career best 800 m time of 1:58.65 in 1990, ranks her 11th on the UK all-time list.

Career
Born Diane Dolores Edwards in Manchester, to Jamaican parents, she won the 1984 English Schools 800 metres title in 2:05.7. She emerged as one of Britain's top 800m runners as a 20-year-old in 1986, winning the AAA Championships title ahead of Lorraine Baker. She went on to win a silver medal at the 1986 Commonwealth Games in Edinburgh in 2:01.12, finishing second to Kirsty Wade. A month later at the 1986 European Championships, she reached the semi-finals of the 800m, where she was eliminated in 2:00.84.

In 1987, Edwards won the UK Championship 800m title in June, ran a personal best of 1:59.30 to finish fourth at the Oslo Grand Prix on 4 July, and retained her AAAs 800m title, to earn selection for the 1987 World Championships, where she reached the semifinals and ran 1:59.34. In 1988, she earned selection for the Seoul Olympic Games, where she ran 1:59.66 in the semifinals, qualifying for the final. In the final, she finished eighth in 2:00.77. She had one of the best seasons of her career in 1989, including running 2:00.83 to finish third in the 800m at the IAAF Grand Prix Final in Monaco, behind Ana Quirot and Christine Wachtel. She was ranked number seven on the 1989 Track & Field News world merit rankings at 800m.

In January 1990, Edwards won the gold medal in the 800m at the Commonwealth Games, winning in 2:00.25. On 14 July 1990 she broke the English record in the 800m with 1:58.65 in Oslo, a time that would remain the best of her career. The previous record was 1:58.98 by Shireen Bailey in 1987, the UK record being held by the Scottish born Welsh athlete Kirsty Wade (1:57.42). In August, Edwards reached the final at the 1990 European Championships, finishing eighth. After struggling with injury, she won her third AAAs 800m title in 1992, to earn selection for the Barcelona Olympics, where she reached the semifinals.

In 1993, now competing as Diane Modahl, she had perhaps the best season of her career, consistently running below two minutes for 800m, with her seasons best being 1:59.00 in Zurich. At the 1993 World Championships in Stuttgart, she ran 1:59.12 in the semifinals to qualify for the final. In the final, won by Maria Mutola, she finished fourth in 1:59.42. Modahl was ranked in the top ten of the Track & Field News 800m world merit rankings for the second time in 1993, again at number seven. In 1994, she won her fifth AAAs 800m title and won the 800m at the European Cup in Gateshead, edging out Patricia Djate of France. However at that years European Championships in Helsinki, she was eliminated in the semifinals, running 2:02.18.

Modahl returned to competition in 1996 and finished second behind Kelly Holmes in the 800 metres at the British Olympic trials in June, running 1:59.87. At the Atlanta Olympic Games in August, she pulled a hamstring in her heat, 50m from the finish. In 1998, she won her sixth AAAs 800m title, before going on to win the 800m bronze medal at the Commonwealth Games in Kuala Lumpur in the world class time of 1:58.81. She competed at her fourth Olympic Games in Sydney 2000, where she was eliminated in the heats running 2:02.41. She retired in 2002 but returned several years later and represented England and won a bronze medal in the 800 metres event, at the 1998 Commonwealth Games in Kuala Lumpur, Malaysia.

Legal challenge against positive drug test 
In 1994, following a routine drug test, Modahl was sent home from the Victoria Commonwealth Games in Canada by the British Athletics Federation and subsequently banned from competition, after the results were returned positive. Modahl challenged the IAAF's drug-testing procedures and said she intended to produce evidence at the hearing which will show ''once and for all that no doping offence has been committed".

On returning to the UK, and adamant of her innocence, Diane engaged lawyers to make the case that the laboratory in Lisbon which tested her sample had major flaws in their processing. The case revealed that the laboratory had stored her urine sample on a table in the stadium in a room heated at 35 °C for three days, causing serious bacterial degradation. The evidence supported Modahl's claim of innocence and she won the case. Modahl said, "I have declared my innocence, I have never taken any banned substance".

The British Athletics Federation lifted Modahl's ban on 25 July 1995. On 25 March 1996 the IAAF cleared Modahl of the charges.

The High Court, Court of Appeal and the House of Lords in London, whose panels included prominent judges such as Lord Irvine and Lord Woolf also stated in their summaries that Modahl should be seen as being innocent of all charges.

Ultimately, the cost financially ruined Modahl  and contributed to the financial collapse of the BAF in 1998, which was replaced by UK Athletics.

Modahl and her husband Vicente wrote a book about their experiences, The Diane Modahl Story - Going the Distance, published in 1995. A second updated edition was released in 1996 after Modahl won her case.

Career after athletics and charity work 

Diane retired from competition in 2002 but remained heavily involved in sport.

In 2010, Diane established the Diane Modahl Sports Foundation (DMSF), a registered charity, alongside her husband, Vincente. DMSF brings athletics coaching opportunities to young people, particularly those living in disadvantaged areas.

Modahl was Lay Adviser to the Central Manchester Clinical Commissioning Group 2014–2015, Non Executive Director Primary Care Trust (PCT) NHS Manchester 2011–2014, and was previously the Chief Ambassador for the National Charity – Street Games. In 2019, she was appointed by Sports England as a member of the Talent Inclusion Advisory Group. She also became Board Trustee of the Greater Manchester Mayor’s Charity.

In 2020, she was appointed by Andy Burnham, Mayor of Greater Manchester, as the Chair of Greater Manchester’s Young Person’s Task Force, an unpaid position designed to aid the Covid-19 recovery process. This included direct engagement with young people and youth organisations as well as with colleges, training providers and business.

In 2021, Commonwealth Games England appointed Modahl to the Board as non-executive directors from 1 May.

Diane also contributes to Street Games; an initiative that harnesses the power of sport to create positive change in the lives of disadvantaged young people right across the UK, and ‘A Bed Every Night’; a scheme that supports the provision of shelter and support for people who are sleeping rough across Greater Manchester.

Honours and awards 
In 2002, Diane was awarded a joint honorary degree of Doctor of Letters alongside Roger Bannister, Clive Lloyd CBE, the Rt Hon Donald McKinnon and Dr Mamphela Ramphele by the Greater Manchester Universities (Manchester Metropolitan University, University of Manchester, Salford University and UMIST) for their great contributions to the Commonwealth  to mark the 17th Commonwealth Games taking place in Manchester in 2002.

In the 2018 Birthday Honours, Diane was appointed a Member of the Order of the British Empire (MBE) for services to sport and young people in North West England.

Personal life 

She is married to Vicente Modahl, a Norwegian international athletics coach and players' agent licensed by the Football Association of England, as well as a UEFA/FIFA match agent.

She took part in the third series of I'm A Celebrity...Get Me Out of Here! in 2004.

Achievements
 6 AAA's Championships 800 metres titles (1986,87,89,92,94,98)
 2 UK Championships titles (1987 800m & 1990 400m)

References

1966 births
Living people
Sportspeople from Manchester
English female middle-distance runners
Olympic athletes of Great Britain
Athletes (track and field) at the 1986 Commonwealth Games
Athletes (track and field) at the 1988 Summer Olympics
Athletes (track and field) at the 1990 Commonwealth Games
Athletes (track and field) at the 1992 Summer Olympics
Athletes (track and field) at the 1996 Summer Olympics
Athletes (track and field) at the 1998 Commonwealth Games
Athletes (track and field) at the 2000 Summer Olympics
Commonwealth Games bronze medallists for England
Commonwealth Games gold medallists for England
Black British sportswomen
English people of Jamaican descent
Commonwealth Games silver medallists for England
Commonwealth Games medallists in athletics
I'm a Celebrity...Get Me Out of Here! (British TV series) participants
Competitors at the 1994 Goodwill Games
Members of the Order of the British Empire
Medallists at the 1986 Commonwealth Games
Medallists at the 1990 Commonwealth Games
Medallists at the 1998 Commonwealth Games